The 1869 East Cheshire by-election was fought on 6 October 1869.  The by-election was fought due to the death of the incumbent MP of the Conservative Party, Edward Christopher Egerton.  It was won by the Conservative candidate William Cunliffe Brooks.

References

1869 elections in the United Kingdom
1869 in England
By-elections to the Parliament of the United Kingdom in Cheshire constituencies
19th century in Cheshire
October 1869 events